Larron Deonne Jackson (born August 26, 1949) is a former professional American football guard in the National Football League. Jackson was drafted in the fourth round of the 1971 NFL Draft by the Houston Oilers. He played six seasons for the Denver Broncos and the Atlanta Falcons.

References 

1949 births
Living people
Players of American football from St. Louis
American football offensive guards
Missouri Tigers football players
Denver Broncos players
Atlanta Falcons players